Merkholtz is a village in the commune of Kiischpelt, in northern Luxembourg.  , the village has a population of 107.

The town is served by Merkholtz railway station.

Kiischpelt
Villages in Luxembourg